Jean-Joseph Renaud (16 January 1873 – 7 December 1953) was a French épée and foil fencer. He competed at the 1900 Summer Olympics.

He was also a prolific journalist, author and playwright whose books La Défense dans la rue (Self Defence in the Street - 1912) and L'Escrime (Fencing - 1911) are recognised as an important contribution to early 20th century literature on those subjects. He was a proponent of the field of honor, saying: "From every point of view dueling is beneficent." He refereed many duels (including ones involving Clemenceau and Leon Blum) and fought at least 15 himself (being a fencing master, all but 4 were fought with pistols; he was victorious in all of them).

References

Notes
Afternoon in the Attic, by John Kobler, copyright 1943-1950

External links
 

1873 births
1953 deaths
French male épée fencers
Olympic fencers of France
Fencers at the 1900 Summer Olympics
Fencers from Paris
French male writers
French male foil fencers